Mark Bell is a New Zealand musician and songwriter. He has played in bands such as The Plague, The Whizz Kids, Blam Blam Blam, Coconut Rough and Ivan Zagni's Big Sideways. He currently works as a session musician in New Zealand.  He is a member of Jordan Luck's band Luck.

He writes articles for NZ Musician magazine.

Discography

Blam Blam Blam

Maids To Order, 1981, EP, 12", Propeller, REV 10 
There Is No Depression in New Zealand, 1981, 7", Propeller, K8422 REV 11
Luxury Length, 1982, LP, Propeller Records, (Rev 204)
Blam Blam Blam, 1992, CD, Propeller, D11319 (Rev 28)
The Complete Blam Blam Blam, 1992, CD, Propeller, D 30899 (REV 502) 
The Complete Blam Blam Blam, 2003, CD, Festival Mushroom, BBB2003

Big Sideways
Big Sideways, 1982, LP, Unsung Music, Unsung 2

Coconut Rough
Coconut Rough, Mushroom, 1984.

Ted Brown and The Italians
If Ever You Need, Pagan, 1993. (cassette)

Whizz Kids
Whizz Kids/Spelling Mistakes, Occupational Hazard, 1980, single, Ripper Records, RIP 004 
Tracks:
Whizz Kids: "Occupational Hazard"
Spelling Mistakes: "Reena"

Sessions

Blue Water, Debbie Harwood & Johnny Bongo, Pagan, 1987.
It’s My Sin, Jan Hellriegel, Eastwest, 1992.
"The Way I feel"/"All The Best Thoughts", Jan Hellriegel, Eastwest, 1992. (cassette)
"It's My Sin"/"Stupidest Thing", Jan Hellriegel, Warner Music New Zealand, 1993. (cassette)
Chinese Whispers, Greg Johnson, EMI, 1997.
Sea Breeze Motel, Greg Johnson, EMI, 2000.
Same Boy, Wayne Mason, Jayrem Records, 2001.
Everest, Rikki Morris, Criminal Records, 1996.
Music From A Lightbulb, The Moth (Tim Mahon), Distributed by Global Routes, c2002.
Love By Satellite, David Parker, Lunacy Records, 1994. CD
Love Explodes, Straw People, Pagan, 1993.

Sources
National Library of New Zealand Catalogue
MySpace.com – Ted Brown

References

 Dix, John, Stranded in Paradise, Paradise Publications, 1988.

External links
 NZ Musician
Blam Blam Blam at Simon Grigg' website 
Where Are They Now at Simon Grigg' website
Pagan Records' Singles 1986–2000 at Simon Grigg' website
Mark Bell at Jordan Luck's website

Living people
New Zealand new wave musicians
Year of birth missing (living people)